Events in the year 2023 in Portugal.

Incumbents 

 President: Marcelo Rebelo de Sousa
 Prime Minister: António Costa (Socialist)

Events 

 16 February: The Portuguese government announces the end of the Portugal Golden Visa investor program, as well as a ban on new licenses for Airbnbs, due to a severe housing shortage and rising rents.

Scheduled
1-6 August: World Youth Day 2023

Deaths 

 10 January – Hermenegildo Candeias, 88, Olympic gymnast (1960).

References 

 
2020s in Portugal
Years of the 21st century in Portugal
Portugal
Portugal